Presidential elections were held in Madagascar on 12 March 1989. Incumbent President Didier Ratsiraka of AREMA won with over 60% of the vote. Voter turnout was 81.04%.

Results

References

Presidential elections in Madagascar
Presidential election
Madagascar
Malagasy presidential election